Bouryiscala is a monotypic genus of medium-sized sea snails, marine gastropod molluscs in the family Cimidae. The only species is Bouryiscala turrisphari.

References

External links
 Iredale, T. (1936) Australian molluscan notes, no. 2. Records of the Australian Museum, 19: 267–340, pls. 20–24.

Cimidae